Quri Kancha (Quechua quri gold, kancha enclosure, enclosed place, yard, a frame, or wall that encloses, also spelled Khori Cancha) is a  mountain in the Bolivian Andes. It is located in the Potosí Department, Charcas Province, San Pedro de Buena Vista Municipality.

References 

Mountains of Potosí Department